Šegestin is a village in central Croatia, in the municipality of Dvor, Sisak-Moslavina County. It is connected by the D6 highway.

Demographics
According to the 2011 census, the village of Šegestin 
has 35 inhabitants. This represents 26.12% of its pre-war population according to the 1991 census.

The 1991 census recorded that 99.25% of the village population were ethnic Serbs (133/134) while 0.75% were ethnic Croats (1/134).

Sights 
The Church of the Holy Prophet, dedicated to honour the holy Mother of God, was built in 1825. In 1942, during the World War II, the church was destroyed by Ustasha. The church was not rebuilt after the war and, for a long time, it stood with bare walls, without roof and towers. The church does not exist anymore in the village and even its foundations are hard to notice as the location is abandoned and not adapted for visitors.

References

Populated places in Sisak-Moslavina County
Serb communities in Croatia